The 1972 Baltimore Orioles season was a season in American baseball. It involved the Orioles finishing third in the American League East with a record of 80 wins and 74 losses.

Offseason 
 October 22, 1971: Mike Ferraro and Mike Herson (minors) were traded by the Orioles to the Milwaukee Brewers for Tom Matchick and Bruce Look.
 November 29, 1971: Tom Walker was drafted from the Orioles by the Montreal Expos in the 1971 rule 5 draft.
 December 2, 1971: Frank Robinson and Pete Richert were traded by the Orioles to the Los Angeles Dodgers for Doyle Alexander, Bob O'Brien, Sergio Robles, and Royle Stillman.
 December 9, 1971: Curt Motton was traded by the Orioles to the Milwaukee Brewers for a player to be named later and cash. The Brewers completed the deal by sending Bob Reynolds to the Orioles on March 25, 1972.
 Prior to 1972 season: Lew Beasley was acquired from the Orioles by the Texas Rangers.

Regular season

Season standings

Record vs. opponents

Opening Day lineup

Notable transactions 
 April 2, 1972: Dave Boswell was released by the Orioles.
 August 18, 1972: Elrod Hendricks was traded by the Orioles to the Chicago Cubs for Tommy Davis.
 August 22, 1972: Chico Salmon was released by the Orioles.

Draft picks 
 June 6, 1972: Bobby Brown was drafted by the Orioles in the 11th round of the 1972 Major League Baseball Draft.

Roster

Player stats

Batting

Starters by position 
Note: Pos = Position; G = Games played; AB = At bats; H = Hits; Avg. = Batting average; HR = Home runs; RBI = Runs batted in

Other batters 
Note: G = Games played; AB = At bats; H = Hits; Avg. = Batting average; HR = Home runs; RBI = Runs batted in

Pitching

Starting pitchers 
Note: G = Games pitched; IP = Innings pitched; W = Wins; L = Losses; ERA = Earned run average; SO = Strikeouts

Other pitchers 
Note: G = Games pitched; IP = Innings pitched; W = Wins; L = Losses; ERA = Earned run average; SO = Strikeouts

Relief pitchers 
Note: G = Games pitched; W = Wins; L = Losses; SV = Saves; ERA = Earned run average; SO = Strikeouts

Awards and honors 
 Brooks Robinson, Commissioner's Award

Farm system 

LEAGUE CHAMPIONS: Miami, Lewiston

Notes

References 

1972 Baltimore Orioles team page at Baseball Reference
1972 Baltimore Orioles season at baseball-almanac.com

Baltimore Orioles seasons
Baltimore Orioles season
Baltimore Orioles